The Tehran Conference (codenamed Eureka) was a strategy meeting of Joseph Stalin, Franklin Roosevelt, and Winston Churchill from 28 November to 1 December 1943, after the Anglo-Soviet invasion of Iran. It was held at the Soviet Union's embassy at Tehran in Iran. It was the first of the World War II conferences of the "Big Three" Allied leaders (the Soviet Union, the United States, and the United Kingdom) and closely followed the Cairo Conference, which had taken place on 22–26 November 1943, and preceded the 1945 Yalta and Potsdam conferences. Although the three leaders arrived with differing objectives, the main outcome of the Tehran Conference was the Western Allies' commitment to open a second front against Nazi Germany. The conference also addressed the 'Big Three' Allies' relations with Turkey and Iran, operations in Yugoslavia and against Japan, and the envisaged postwar settlement. A separate contract signed at the conference pledged the Big Three to recognize Iranian independence.

Background
Once the German-Soviet War broke out in June 1941, Churchill offered assistance to the Soviets, and an agreement to that effect was signed on 12 July 1941. However, Churchill, in a spoken radio transmission announcing the alliance with the Soviets, reminded listeners that the alliance would not change his stance against communism.

Delegations had traveled between London and Moscow to arrange the implementation of that support, and when the United States joined the war in December 1941, the delegations met in Washington as well. A Combined Chiefs of Staff committee was created to co-ordinate British and American operations and their support to the Soviets. The consequences of a global war, the absence of a unified Allied strategy, and the complexity of allocating resources between Europe and Asia had not yet been sorted out, which soon gave rise to mutual suspicions between the Western Allies and the Soviet Union. There was the question of opening a second front to alleviate the German pressure on the Soviet Red Army on the Eastern Front, the question of mutual assistance (since both the United Kingdom and the Soviet Union were looking towards the United States for credit and material support, there was tension between the United States and Britain since the Americans had no desire to prop up the British Empire in the event of an Allied victory). Also, neither the United States nor the United Kingdom was prepared to give Stalin a free hand in Eastern Europe, and there was no common policy on how to deal with Germany after the war. Communications regarding those matters between Churchill, Roosevelt, and Stalin took place by telegrams and via emissaries, but it was evident that direct negotiations were urgently needed.

Stalin was reluctant to leave Moscow and unwilling to risk journeys by air, and Roosevelt was physically disabled and found travel difficult. Churchill was an avid traveller and, as part of an ongoing series of wartime conferences, had already met with Roosevelt five times in North America and twice in Africa and had also held two prior meetings with Stalin in Moscow. To arrange the urgently-needed meeting, Roosevelt tried to persuade Stalin to travel to Cairo. Stalin turned down the offer and also offers to meet in Baghdad or Basra. He finally agreed to meet in Tehran in November 1943.

Proceedings

The conference was to convene at 16:00 on 28 November 1943. Stalin had arrived well before, followed by Roosevelt, who brought in his wheelchair from his accommodation adjacent to the venue. Roosevelt, who had traveled  to attend and whose health was already deteriorating, was met by Stalin. This was the first time that they had met. Churchill, walking with his general staff from their accommodations nearby, arrived half an hour later. According to Roosevelt's interpreter, Charles Bohlen, Roosevelt was accompanied by Harry Hopkins, who had served as Roosevelt's personal emissary to Churchill, and W. Averell Harriman, the U.S. Ambassador to the Soviet Union.  Stalin was accompanied by Soviet Minister of Foreign Affairs Vyacheslav Molotov and military leader Kliment Voroshilov.  Churchill brought Foreign Secretary Anthony Eden and chief military assistant Hastings Ismay, in addition to his interpreter Arthur Birse.

As Stalin had been advocating for a second front since 1941, he was very pleased and felt that he had accomplished his principal goal for the meeting. Moving on, Stalin agreed to enter the war against Japan once Germany was defeated:

The leaders then turned to the conditions under which the Western Allies would open a new front by invading northern France (Operation Overlord), as Stalin had pressed them to do since 1941. Until then, Churchill had advocated the expansion of joint operations of British, American, and Commonwealth forces in the Mediterranean, as opening a new western front had been physically impossible because of a lack of existing shipping routes. That left the Mediterranean and Italy as viable goals for 1943. It was agreed Operation Overlord would be launched by American and British forces by May 1944 and that Stalin would support the Allies with a concurrent major offensive on Germany's eastern front (Operation Bagration) to divert German forces from northern France.

Additional offensives were also discussed to complement the undertaking of Operation Overlord, including the possible allied invasion of southern France prior to the landings at Normandy with the goal of drawing German forces away from the northern beaches and even a possible strike at the northern tip of the Adriatic to circumvent the Alps and drive towards Vienna. Either plan would have relied on Allied divisions engaged against the German Army in Italy around the time of the conference.

Iran and Turkey were discussed in detail. Roosevelt, Churchill, and Stalin all agreed to support the Iranian government, as addressed in the following declaration:

In addition, the Soviets pledged support to Turkey if it entered the war. Roosevelt, Churchill and Stalin agreed that it would also be most desirable if Turkey entered on the Allies' side before the year was out.

Churchill argued for the invasion of Italy in 1943, then Overlord in 1944, on the basis that Overlord was physically impossible in 1943 for lack of shipping and that it would be unthinkable to do anything important until it could be launched. Churchill  successfully proposed to Stalin a westward movement of Poland, which Stalin accepted. It gave the Poles industrialized German land to the west but took marshlands to the east. It also provided a territorial buffer to the Soviet Union against invasion. Churchill's plan involved a border along the Oder and the Eastern Neisse, which he views to give Poland a fair compensation for the Eastern Borderlands.

Dinner meeting
Before the Tripartite Dinner Meeting of 29 November 1943 at the Conference, Churchill presented Stalin with a specially commissioned ceremonial sword (the "Sword of Stalingrad," made in Sheffield), as a gift from King George VI to the citizens of Stalingrad and the Soviet people, commemorating the Soviet victory at Stalingrad. When Stalin received the sheathed sword, he took it with both hands and kissed the scabbard. (He then handed it to Marshal Kliment Voroshilov, who mishandled it, causing the sword to fall to the ground.)

Stalin proposed executing 50,000 to 100,000 German officers so that Germany could not plan another war. Roosevelt, believing that Stalin was not serious, joked that "maybe 49,000 would be enough." Churchill, however, was outraged and denounced "the cold blooded execution of soldiers who fought for their country." He said that only war criminals should be put on trial in accordance with the Moscow Document, which he had written. He stormed out of the room but was brought back in by Stalin, who said he was joking. Churchill was glad Stalin had relented but thought that Stalin had been testing the waters.

Three powers come together 

On 1 December 1943, the three leaders re-assembled and issued a set of declarations.  They also negotiated the following military conclusions at the conference.

Iran would go to war with Germany, a common enemy to the three powers. Stalin, Churchill, and Roosevelt addressed the issue of Iran's special financial needs during the war and the possibility of needing aid after the war. The three powers declared to continue to render aid to Iran. The Iranian government and the three powers reach an accord within all the disagreements to maintain the independence, sovereignty, and integrity of Iran. The United States, the Soviet Union, and the United Kingdom expected Iran to follow along with the other Allies to establish peace once the war was over, which was agreed upon when the declaration was made.

Military decisions
 The Yugoslav Partisans would be supported by supplies, equipment, and commando operations.
 The leaders stated that it would be desirable for Turkey to join the war on the side of the Allies before the end of the year.
 The leaders took note of Stalin's statement that if Turkey found herself at war with Germany and, as a result, Bulgaria declared war on or attacked Turkey, the Soviet Union would immediately be at war with Bulgaria. The Conference noted that this could be mentioned in the forthcoming negotiations to bring Turkey into the war.
The cross-channel invasion of France (Operation Overlord) would be launched during May 1944, in conjunction with an operation against southern France (Operation Dragoon). The latter operation would be undertaken in as great a strength as the availability of landing-craft permitted. The Conference further took note of Stalin's statement that the Soviet forces would launch an offensive (Operation Bagration) about the same time with the object of preventing the German forces from transferring from the Eastern Front to the Western Front. Operation Overlord was to be on 1 June, but the moon and tides required to be delayed to 5 June. 
 The leaders agreed for the military staff of the three powers to keep in close contact with one another in regard to the impending operations in Europe. In particular, a cover plan to mislead the enemy about the operations was to be concocted by the staff concerned.

Political decisions 
Stalin and Churchill discussed the future borders of Poland and settled on the Curzon Line in the east and the Oder-Eastern Neisse Line in the west. Roosevelt had asked to be excused from any discussion of Poland out of consideration for the effects of any decision on Polish voters in the US and the upcoming 1944 election. The decision was therefore not ratified until the Potsdam Conference of 1945.

During the negotiations, Roosevelt secured the reincorporation of the Republics of Lithuania, Latvia, and Estonia into the Soviet Union only after the citizens voted on those actions. Stalin would not consent to any international control over the elections and stated that all issues would have to be resolved in accordance with the Soviet Constitution.

Results
The Yugoslav Partisans were given full Allied support, and Allied support to the Yugoslav Chetniks was halted. (They were believed to be cooperating with the occupying Germans rather than fighting them; see Yugoslavia and the Allies.)

The communist Partisans under Josip Broz Tito took power in Yugoslavia as the Germans gradually retreated from the Balkans in 1944 and 1945.

Turkish President İsmet İnönü conferred with Roosevelt and Churchill at the Cairo Conference in November 1943 and promised to enter the war when his country had become fully armed. By August 1944, Turkey broke off relations with Germany. In February 1945, Turkey declared war on Germany and Japan, which may have been a symbolic move that allowed Turkey to join the future United Nations.

Operation Overlord 
Roosevelt and Stalin spent much of the conference to try to convince Churchill to commit to an invasion of France and finally succeeded on 30 November, when Roosevelt announced at lunch that they would be launching the invasion in May 1944. That pleased Stalin, who had been pressing his allies to open a new front in the west to alleviate some pressure on his troops. That decision may be the most critical to come out of this conference, as the desired effect of the relief of Soviet troops was achieved and led to a Soviet rally and advance toward Germany, a tide that Hitler could not stem.

United Nations 
The Tehran Conference also served as one of the first conversations surrounding the formation of the United Nations. Roosevelt first introduced Stalin to the idea of an international organization comprising all nation states, a venue for the resolution of common issues, and a check against international aggressors. With Germany having thrust the world into chaos for the second time in as many generations, the three world leaders all agreed that something must be done to prevent a similar occurrence.

Division of Germany 
There was a shared view among the participants that a postwar division of Germany was necessary with the sides differing on the number of divisions needed to neutralize her ability to wage war. The numbers that were proposed varied widely and never came to fruition, but the powers would effectively divide modern Germany into two parts until the end of the Cold War. During one dinner, Churchill questioned Stalin on his postwar territorial ambitions. Stalin replied, "There is no need to speak at this present time about any Soviet Desires, but when the time comes we will speak."

Soviet entry to the Pacific War 
On 29 November, Roosevelt asked Stalin five questions about data and intelligence relating to Japanese and Siberian ports and about air bases in the Maritime Provinces for up to 1,000 heavy bombers. On 2 February, Stalin told the American ambassador that America could operate 1,000 bombers from Siberia after the Soviet Union had declared war on Japan (Vladivostok is in the Russian Far East, not Siberia).

Alleged assassination plot

According to Soviet reports, German agents planned to kill the Big Three leaders at the Tehran Conference, but called off the assassination while it was still in the planning stage. The NKVD, the USSR's counterintelligence unit, first notified Mike Reilly, Roosevelt's chief of security, of the suspected assassination plot several days before Roosevelt's  arrival in Tehran. Reilly had gone to Tehran several days early to evaluate security concerns and explore potential routes from Cairo to Tehran. Just before Reilly returned to Cairo, the NKVD informed him that dozens of Germans had been dropped into Tehran by parachute the day before. The NKVD suspected German agents were planning to kill the Big Three leaders at the Tehran Conference.

When housing accommodations for the meeting were originally discussed, both Stalin and Churchill had extended invitations to Roosevelt, asking him to stay with them during the meeting. However, Roosevelt wanted to avoid the appearance of choosing one ally over another and decided it was important to stay at the American legation to remain independent. Roosevelt arrived in Tehran on 27 November 1943 and settled into the American legation. Close to midnight, Vyacheslav Molotov, Stalin's top aide, summoned Archibald Clark-Kerr (the British ambassador in the Soviet Union) and Averell Harriman (the American ambassador in the Soviet Union) to the Soviet embassy, warning them of an assassination plot against Roosevelt, Churchill and Stalin. Molotov informed them several assassins had been apprehended, but reported additional assassins were at large and expressed concerns for President Roosevelt's safety. Molotov advised Roosevelt should be moved to the safety of the British or Soviet embassy.

Americans suspected Stalin had fabricated the assassination plot as an excuse to have Roosevelt moved to the Soviet embassy. Mike Reilly, Roosevelt's chief of Secret Service, advised him to move to either the Soviet or British embassies for his safety. One of the underlying factors influencing their decision was the distance Churchill and Stalin would need to travel for meetings at the American legation. Harriman reminded the President that the Americans would be held responsible if Stalin or Churchill were assassinated while traveling to visit Roosevelt all the way across the city. Earlier that day, Molotov had agreed to hold all meetings at the American legation because traveling was difficult for Roosevelt. The timing of Molotov announcing an assassination plot later that night aroused suspicion that his motives were to keep Stalin safely within the guarded walls of the Soviet embassy. Harriman doubted the existence of an assassination plot, but urged the President to relocate to avoid the perception of putting Churchill and Stalin in danger. Roosevelt did not believe there was a credible threat of assassination, but agreed to the move so he could be closer to Stalin and Churchill. Living in the Soviet embassy also allowed Roosevelt to gain more direct access to Stalin and build his trust. Stalin liked having Roosevelt in the embassy because it eliminated the need to travel outside the compound and it allowed him to spy on Roosevelt more easily. The Soviet embassy was guarded by thousands of secret police and located adjacent to the British embassy, which allowed the Big Three to meet securely.

After the Tehran Conference ended, Harriman asked Molotov whether there was really ever an assassination threat in Tehran. Molotov said that they knew about German agents in Tehran, but did not know of a specific assassination plot. Molotov's response minimized their assertions of an assassination plot, instead emphasizing that Stalin thought President Roosevelt would be safer at the Soviet embassy.  American and British intelligence reports generally dismissed the existence of this plot and Otto Skorzeny, the alleged leader of the operation, later claimed that Hitler had dismissed the idea as unworkable before planning had even begun. The topic continues to be a theme of certain Russian historians.

See also

 List of Allied World War II conferences
 List of Soviet Union–United States summits
History of the United Nations
 Teheran 43
 The Eagle Has Landed

References

Citations

Bibliography

 Best, Geoffrey. Churchill: A Study in Greatness. London: Hambledon and London, 2001.
 "Cold War: Teheran Declaration." CNN. 1998. 26 March 2006.
 Feis, Herbert. Churchill-Roosevelt-Stalin (Princeton U.P. 1967), pp. 191–279
 Foster, Rhea Dulles. "The Road to Tehran: The Story of Russia and America, 1781 – 1943." — Princeton, New Jersey: Princeton University Press, 1944. — 279 p.
 Hamzavi, A. H.  "Iran and the Tehran Conference," International Affairs (1944) 20#2 pp. 192–203 in JSTOR
  McNeill, Robert. America, Britain, & Russia: their cooperation and conflict, 1941–1946 (1953) 348-68
 Mastny, Vojtech. "Soviet War Aims at the Moscow and Tehran Conferences of 1943," Journal of Modern History (1975) 47#3 pp. 481–504 in JSTOR
 Mayle, Paul D. Eureka Summit: Agreement in Principle & the Big Three at Tehran, 1943 (1987, U of Delaware Press) 210p.

Primary sources

 Miscellaneous No. 8 (1947) "Military Conclusions of the Tehran Conference. Tehran, 1 December 1943." British Parliamentary Papers. By Royal Command. CMD 7092 Presented by the Secretary of State for Foreign Affairs to Parliament by Command of His Majesty.
 The Tehran, Yalta & Potsdam Conferences. Documents. Moscow: Progress Publishers. 1969.

The Ministry of Foreign Affairs Iran (Hrsg.): The Tehran Conference – The Three-Power Declaration Concerning Iran. Tehran December 1943. Reprint epubli, Berlin 2021, .

Further reading

External links

 Encyclopædia Britannica, Teheran Conference
 United States Department of State

World War II conferences
Poland in World War II
Joseph Stalin
Winston Churchill
History of Tehran
Iran–Soviet Union relations
Soviet Union–United Kingdom relations
Foreign relations of the Soviet Union
1943 in Iran
Soviet Union–United States diplomatic conferences
Diplomatic conferences in Iran
Aftermath of World War II
Allied occupation of Europe
Poland–United Kingdom relations
1943 conferences
1943 in international relations
Iran–United Kingdom relations
Iran in World War II
20th century in Tehran
Articles containing video clips
November 1943 events
December 1943 events